Loyalty of Love (Italian: Teresa Confalonieri) is a 1934 Italian historical drama film directed by Guido Brignone and starring Marta Abba, Nerio Bernardi and Luigi Cimara. It is based on the story of Teresa Confalonieri, a celebrated figure of the Italian reunification campaign. It was one of several films made during the 1930s that portrayed this era. It premiered at the Venice Film Festival in August 1934.

The film was shot at the Cines Studios in Rome with sets designed by the art director Guido Fiorini.

Cast
 Marta Abba as Teresa Confalonieri 
 Nerio Bernardi as Il conte Federico Confalonieri 
 Luigi Cimara as Il principe de Metternich 
 Elsa De Giorgi as La principessa Carolina Jablonowska 
 Filippo Scelzo as Il barone Salvotti 
 Luigi Carini as Il conte Vitaliano Confalonieri 
 Riccardo Tassani as Franz the First 
 Tina Lattanzi as L'imperatrice Carolina 
 Achille Majeroni as Il feldmaresciallo Bubna 
 Giovanni Barrella as Bolchesi – il servitore 
 Carlo Tamberlani as Luigi Parravicini 
 Romolo Costa as Il governatore di Milano 
 Luigi Erminio D'Olivo as Cavaliere di Castillo 
 Eugenio Duse as Il ministro di polizia 
 Mercedes Brignone as La marchesa al ballo 
 Lilla Brignone as La marchesina al ballo 
 Elli Parvo as La nobildonna al ballo 
 Vinicio Sofia as Un uomo di fiducia del barone Salvati 
 Mauro Serra as Conte Ilario 
 Renato Ferrari as Giudice Menghin 
 Maria Zanoli as La cameriera pettegola di casa Confalonieri 
 Cesare Polacco as Il banditore al patibolo 
 Idolo Tancredi as Operaio della stamperia

References

Bibliography
 Norma Bouchard. Risorgimento in Modern Italian Culture: Revisiting the Nineteenth-century Past in History, Narrative, and Cinema. Fairleigh Dickinson Univ Press, 2005.

External links

1934 films
Films directed by Guido Brignone
Italian black-and-white films
1930s Italian-language films
Italian historical drama films
1930s historical drama films
Cines Studios films
Films set in the 19th century
1934 drama films
1930s Italian films